"Cuts Like a Knife" is a song by Canadian rock musician Bryan Adams. It was released in May 1983 as the second single from his third studio album of the same name (1983). It peaked at number 6 on the  Billboard Top Rock Tracks chart and number 15 on the  Billboard Hot 100. The song has appeared on all of Adams' compilation albums with the exception of The Best of Me.

Writing and recording
In an interview in 1988 with Vancouver's Georgia Straight newspaper, Adams explained how Vallance and he came up with the title for the song:

"I think that I'm one of the world's best mumblers, I can mumble some of the best lyrics, but putting them together is another story. I think that's where Jim is really good -- he can piece a story together. It's just a good thing to have the tape rolling when you're recording me. The best example was when we wrote "Cuts Like A Knife," which was just literally a mumble. We looked at each other, rolled the tape back, and it sounded like "cuts like a knife," so we started singing that."

Adams and Vallance jammed on the chord progression for a while Adams sang "it cuts like a knife" over and over again. Vallance eventually responded with "but it feels so right." As Vallance described it, "There's a long tradition in pop music of songs that employ "na-na-na" choruses: "Hey Jude" by The Beatles, "Na Na Hey Hey Kiss Him Goodbye" by Steam, "Lovin', Touchin', Squeezin'" by Journey, and more recently "Drops of Jupiter (Tell Me)" by Train. Adams and I tapped into that tradition for the out-choruses of 'Cuts Like A Knife'."

Release and reception
"Cuts Like a Knife" was released in 1983, peaking at number 15 on the Billboard Hot 100 and number 6 on the Hot Rock Tracks chart. The song reached number 12 on the Canadian singles chart and remained in the top twenty for seven weeks. "Cuts Like a Knife" was Adams' highest charting single to date in Canada while the previous single "Straight from the Heart" was the higher charting song on the US  Hot 100 peaking at number 10. "Cuts Like a Knife" won the Procan Award (Performing Rights Organization of Canada) for Canadian radio airplay in 1983 and was nominated for a Juno Award for Single of the Year in 1984.

Cash Box described it as a "tough talking break-up song" and praised Adams' "forceful," raspy vocal.  Stewart Mason from Allmusic said "More of an anthemic rocker than the previous power ballad hit, "Straight from the Heart," "Cuts Like a Knife" breaks absolutely no new ground lyrically or musically, but as with his previous hit, Adams here proves his worth as both a singer and songwriter."

The B-sides of the singles were tracks from his previous albums, You Want It You Got It and his first album, except for the France single which had "Take Me Back" from the same album.

Music video
The music video for "Cuts Like a Knife" was directed by Irish director Steve Barron, who filmed it inside an empty indoor swimming pool in Hollywood. The pool had been drained and out-of-use for several years. It would also become the location for Adams's platinum album party. The music video for "Cuts Like a Knife" was in heavy rotation on MTV during 1983 and was one of that year's most popular.

The woman seen in the video is a Penthouse magazine model named Raquel Pena. She later stated that she was chosen at the audition because "Steve Barron wanted someone with really long legs, and I wore a black bathing suit that he liked. I wore the same suit in the video. That's how low budget it was!"

Track listings

Personnel
Bryan Adams – rhythm guitar, lead vocals, backing vocals
Keith Scott – lead guitar, backing vocals
Mickey Curry – drums
Tommy Mandel – keyboard
Dave Taylor – bass guitar, backing vocals
Jim Vallance - percussion

Additional backing vocalists
Bob Clearmountain
Bruce Allen
Jimmy Wesley
K. Davies
L. Frenette
M. Simpson
Lou Gramm

Chart positions

References

External links
 

Bryan Adams songs
1983 singles
Songs written by Jim Vallance
Songs written by Bryan Adams
Music videos directed by Steve Barron
A&M Records singles
Song recordings produced by Bob Clearmountain
1983 songs